Ligiah Villalobos is a Latina writer and producer. She is best known for her work as head writer for the Nick Jr. show "Go, Diego! Go!" as well as producing and writing the Sundance film "Under the Same Moon".

Early life and education 
Ligiah Villalobos was born to Efrain Villalobos and Olivia Rojas, in Chihuahua, Mexico and immigrated to the United States of America during her childhood. While she was born in Chihuahua, Villalobos states that she was raised in Mexico City. She moved to the United States at the age of eleven.

She attended college at an older age. She graduated with her BA in creative writing from Antioch University in September 2013 and also received her MFA in creative writing from the same institution in May 2016,Though she never received her degree, Ligiah also studied at Brigham Young University for four years.

Career 
Villalobos has produced many films and TV shows. Her most notable works include Under the Same Moon. She was the head writer for the children's Nickelodeon show “Go, Diego! Go!”, and the NBC TV series, “Ed”. 

She “has developed projects for multiple studios and networks, including NBC, ABC/Family, FX, Showtime, BET, and HBO”. Villalobos consulted on the Planes, Coco, and Sprout TV series Nina's World. She was “a studio executive at The Walt Disney Company, where she oversaw all television production in Latin America for five years”. Here, she launched “eight children shows in seven countries” and oversaw the Writing Fellowship Program and the Director's Training Program for a year. At The Warner Bros TV Network, Villalobos served as a Current Programming Executive, “where she oversaw six prime times shows, including the four highest rated shows on the network”. 

She has also written a pilot for NBC titled ‘Loteria’, a pilot for Starz based on the NY Times best seller "The Dirty Girls Social Club", and an animated feature film called "Chito and the Land of Xo" that is currently being developed. 

In 2012 Villalobos wrote the Hallmark Hall of Fame/ABC TV movie Firelight. She also co-wrote the Lifetime TV movie "The Real MVP" (2016), which was produced by Queen Latifah and Shelby Stone.

Ligiah has been on the board of the Writers Guild Foundation and on the board of the National Hispanic Media Coalition.

Under the Same Moon 
As its Writer and Executive Producer, Under the Same Moon is Villalobos’ most well known work. This film was an “Official Selection at the 2007 Sundance Film Festival and became the highest sale for a Spanish-language film in the history of Sundance”. She originally wrote the film 7 years prior to its execution because she wanted to make the career transition from producer to writer. As a child immigrant from Mexico herself, Ligiah did not want to create another ‘crossing the border story’ but one “about the displacement of children as a result of parents coming to live in this country”. She wanted to focus on the abandonment of children, a theme that resonated in her own childhood due to the divorce of her parents. Villalobos wanted to show the world the reality of life as an immigrant, and drew much of the story from her own life experiences. The hardest and most emotional scene to write was about the main character, Carlitos, waiting to be picked up by his father.

Before the film went into production, Villalobos had to re-purchase the rights to it from the original producers, since her script had been with them for five years. After struggling with two production companies, the team for this movie decided to make it an independent film and raised the necessary funds within a month. After getting into Sundance, the film sold for five million.

Awards 
She won a Humanitas Prize in 2013

References 

Date of birth missing (living people)
Living people
American writers of Mexican descent
Mexican film producers
American film producers
Writers from Chihuahua
Year of birth missing (living people)